Trichonectes otini is a species of beetle in the family Dytiscidae, the only species in the genus Trichonectes.

References

Dytiscidae